Masafu General Hospital, also Masafu Hospital, is a hospital in the Eastern Region of Uganda.

Location
The coordinates of Masafu General Hospital are: 00°24'48.0"N, 34°02'05.0"E (Latitude:0.413333; Lonitude:34.034722).

Overview
Masafu General Hospital was established in 2010 when the Masafu Health Centre IV was upgraded to hospital status. The hospital attends to a large number of HIV/AIDS patients. This hospital is on the list of general hospitals earmarked for renovation and expansion.

See also
 List of hospitals in Uganda

References

External links
 Website of Uganda Ministry of Health

Hospitals in Uganda
Busia District, Uganda
Eastern Region, Uganda
Hospitals established in 2010
2010 establishments in Uganda